Cunctochrysa is a genus of insects belonging to the family Chrysopidae.

The species of this genus are found in Europe, Southern Africa and Japan.

Species:
 Cunctochrysa albolineata (Killington, 1935)

References

Chrysopidae
Neuroptera genera